Mediator complex subunit 20 (Med20) is a protein that in humans is encoded by the MED20 gene.

See also
Mediator

Human proteins